Marc Joseph John Crawford (born February 13, 1961) is a Canadian professional ice hockey coach and former player. He is currently the head coach of the ZSC Lions of the National League (NL). Crawford won the Stanley Cup in 1996 as head coach of the Colorado Avalanche. He played as a forward for the Vancouver Canucks.

Early life
During his teenage years, Crawford attended Nicholson Catholic College in Belleville, Ontario. He is the son of professional hockey player Floyd Crawford. He is the brother of NHL hockey players Bob Crawford and Lou Crawford.

Playing career
Crawford played three seasons of major junior in the Quebec Major Junior Hockey League (QMJHL) with the Cornwall Royals. During this time, the team won back-to-back Memorial Cups. Crawford was drafted by the Vancouver Canucks in the 1980 NHL Entry Draft in the fourth round, 70th overall. He joined the Canucks in 1981–82. As a rookie, Crawford was a part of Vancouver's 1982 run to the Stanley Cup finals, in which the Canucks were defeated by the New York Islanders.

During his six seasons in the NHL, Crawford would split time between Vancouver and their American Hockey League (AHL) affiliate, the Fredericton Express. As a result of constantly flying between the two cities, which are over 5,000 kilometers apart, he earned the nickname "747", though most contemporary Canucks fans know him as "Crow", a nickname coined during his tenure as a head coach with the team. In total, Crawford tallied 19 goals, 31 assists and 50 points in 176 games during his NHL career. After a season in the International Hockey League with the Milwaukee Admirals, Crawford retired as a professional player.

Coaching career

Early coaching career
Immediately after retiring as a player, Crawford became a head coach in the Ontario Hockey League (OHL) with the Cornwall Royals, for whom he had previously played in the QMJHL. After two seasons with Cornwall, Crawford moved to the AHL, and in his first season with the St. John's Maple Leafs, he took his team to the 1992 Calder Cup finals, losing to the Adirondack Red Wings. The following season, Crawford was awarded the Louis A. R. Pieri Memorial Award as the AHL's coach of the year.

In 1994–95, Crawford broke into the NHL with the Quebec Nordiques and achieved immediate success. As a result, he won the NHL's Jack Adams Award as coach of the year. He is the youngest NHL coach in history to win the Jack Adams. The next season, the Nordiques franchise was relocated to Colorado as the Avalanche, and Crawford won his first and only Stanley Cup as a coach in 1996, defeating the Florida Panthers in four games in the finals.

Crawford would continue to post successful regular seasons with the Avalanche in the next two seasons, but after an early first-round exit in the 1998 playoffs, he resigned on May 27, 1998. Despite reportedly being offered a one-year contract extension by general manager Pierre Lacroix, Crawford decided to "move on and accept a new challenge".

Before his resignation with the Avalanche, Crawford was also the head coach of the Canadian Olympic hockey team at the 1998 Olympics, where they finished a disappointing fourth. Many fans questioned his choice of players to take part in the semi-final shootout with the Czech Republic, in which they lost, electing not to use future Hall of Famers Wayne Gretzky or Steve Yzerman.

Vancouver Canucks
After a brief stint as a color commentator on Hockey Night in Canada, Crawford replaced Mike Keenan as head coach of the Vancouver Canucks midway through the 1998–99 season. Joining Vancouver in the midst of a rebuilding period for the franchise, Crawford slowly developed the Canucks into a successful regular season team, playing a fast-paced and offensively emphasized style of play. After one-and-a-half seasons, he led Vancouver back to the playoffs. However, the Canucks were defeated in the first round by his former team, Colorado.

In 2002–03, Vancouver continued to improve under Crawford and posted a franchise record (since surpassed) of 104 points. The following season, they took the Northwest Division title from the Avalanche, who had finished first in their division every season since they won the Northeast Division during their last season playing in Quebec. Despite Vancouver's regular season success, they only managed to win one playoff series during Crawford's tenure. After the Canucks' failure to make the playoffs in the 2005–06 season, Crawford's position as head coach was terminated by management on April 25, 2006. He was replaced by Alain Vigneault.

In six-and-a-half seasons' work with the Canucks, Crawford marked himself as the longest-serving and winningest head coach in franchise history, coaching 529 games and 246 wins. On February 3, 2006, one of his last games in Vancouver, he also became the third-youngest head coach in NHL history to reach 400 wins. At 48 years and 342 days, this mark trails only Scotty Bowman and Glen Sather.

Later years
Nearly one month after being fired by Vancouver, Crawford was hired by the Los Angeles Kings, a team in a similar situation to that of the Canucks when Crawford first joined them. On June 10, 2008, Crawford was fired by the Kings, although he had one year remaining on his initial contract. He lasted only two years with the Kings, who thought a change was necessary in the coaching position. During his two seasons with the Kings, he missed the playoffs both times, making the 2004 playoffs as his last playoff appearance as a head coach.

During the 2008–09 season, Crawford did color commentary for Hockey Night in Canada late games alongside play-by-play announcer Mark Lee.

A year after being fired from the Los Angeles Kings, Crawford was hired by Dallas Stars general manager Joe Nieuwendyk to replace previous head coach Dave Tippett. The Stars fired Crawford on April 12, 2011, two days after the Stars' loss to the Minnesota Wild in the last game of the season, which ultimately cost the team the opportunity to capture the eighth playoff berth in the Western Conference. Just like in LA, Crawford's tenure in Dallas lasted only two seasons.

In the summer of 2012, Crawford was named the new coach of the ZSC Lions of the Swiss National League A, having signed a two-year contract. He won the NLA championship with the Lions in the 2013–14 season. In March 2014, he signed a two-year contract extension. In spring 2015, Crawford was responsible for convincing coveted draft prospect Auston Matthews to sign and play with the Lions for the 2015–16 season. Crawford was awed by Matthews' play during the 2015 U18 Championships and contacted Matthews' family and agent about a contract. Crawford would lead the Lions to winning the 2016 Swiss Cup. Crawford left ZSC when his contract expired in 2016. Besides winning the 2014 Swiss championship and 2016 Swiss Cup, he also guided the Lions to three NLA regular season championship titles, in 2013–14, 2014–15 and 2015–16.

In May 2016, following the hiring of Guy Boucher, Crawford was hired as associate coach for the Ottawa Senators. On March 1, 2019, Crawford became the interim head coach of the Senators following the firing of Guy Boucher for the rest of the 2018–19 season going 7–10–1. D. J. Smith was then hired as the Senators head coach for the 2019–20 season. 

On June, 4, 2019 The Chicago Blackhawks announced Crawford as an assistant coach to Jeremy Colliton.

Awards and achievements
 Louis A. R. Pieri Memorial Award (AHL coach of the year) – 1993
 Jack Adams Award (NHL coach of the year) – 1995
 Stanley Cup champion (Colorado Avalanche) – 1996
 Canada Olympic head coach – 1998

Career statistics

Regular season and playoffs

International

Head coaching record

Moore incident

On February 16, 2004, when Crawford was coach of Vancouver, Colorado player Steve Moore concussed Vancouver captain Markus Näslund on a questionable hit. No penalty was called on the play, and the NHL later reviewed the incident and decided no penalty was warranted. However, Crawford was vocal about the incident and the failure of the NHL to respond. During another game against Colorado on March 8, 2004, Todd Bertuzzi grabbed and punched Moore from behind, and rode him into the ice, causing Moore to suffer three broken vertebrae and multiple facial lacerations, which ultimately ended his career. According to a Colorado player, Crawford was laughing at the situation at the time it occurred and was the subject of substantial criticism following the incident.

Crawford, along with Bertuzzi and the Canucks organization, were named as defendants in a $19+ million (US) lawsuit by Moore. According to the suit, following the February 16 incident, Crawford encouraged his players to seek revenge, which led in part to the injury to Moore. Specifically, Moore alleged that Crawford, Bertuzzi and former general manager Brian Burke entered into "an unlawful plan and agreement to assault, batter and injure Moore at a future date for the injuries that Näslund had suffered during the Feb. 16 game". The Canucks were fined US$250,000 by the NHL for "...failure to prevent the atmosphere that may have led to the incident". As the case approached trial in 2014, Moore increased the damages claim to $68 million. In August 2014, the lawsuit concluded with all parties agreeing to a confidential settlement.

Abuse of players and apology
In December 2019, multiple former players Crawford coached in the past came forward with stories of abuse, including Brent Sopel, Patrick O'Sullivan, Harold Druken and Sean Avery. Sopel had since clarified it was not his intention "to make any allegations against anyone or any organization", and Avery also offered support for Crawford.

The Chicago Blackhawks suspended Marc from his role as assistant coach following these allegations and opened an investigation.  Crawford subsequently issued an apology to past players that brought forward stories of abuse.

References

External links

1961 births
Living people
Canada men's national ice hockey team coaches
Canadian ice hockey coaches
Canadian ice hockey forwards
Colorado Avalanche coaches
Cornwall Royals (OHL) coaches
Cornwall Royals (QMJHL) players
Dallas Black Hawks players
Dallas Stars coaches
Fredericton Express players
Ice hockey people from Ontario
Jack Adams Award winners
Los Angeles Kings coaches
Milwaukee Admirals (IHL) players
National Hockey League broadcasters
Ottawa Senators coaches
Quebec Nordiques coaches
Sportspeople from Belleville, Ontario
St. John's Maple Leafs coaches
Stanley Cup champions
Stanley Cup championship-winning head coaches
Vancouver Canucks coaches
Vancouver Canucks draft picks
Vancouver Canucks players